Calumma glawi is a species of chameleon found in Madagascar.

References

Calumma
Reptiles of Madagascar
Reptiles described in 1997
Taxa named by Wolfgang Böhme (herpetologist)